Chester James (Pop) Chadbourne (October 28, 1884 – June 21, 1943) was an outfielder in  Major League Baseball, playing mainly as a center fielder for three teams between  and . Chadbourne spent portions of five seasons in the major leagues, but his only two complete major league seasons were with the Kansas City Packers of the Federal League. He had more success in the minor leagues, collecting more than 3000 hits over 20 years. 

After his playing career, Chadbourne managed and umpired in the minor leagues.

Early life and career
Chadbourne was born in Parkman, Maine.

In 1914, Chadbourne became the first major league player to bat at Wrigley Field (then called Weeghman Park), hitting leadoff for the Packers against the Chicago Chi-Feds on April 23.
     
In a five-season career, Chadbourne was a .255 hitter (345-for-1353) with two home runs and 82 RBI in 347 games, including 183 runs, 41 doubles, 18 triples, and 78 stolen bases.

Later life
Following his major league career, Chadbourne returned to the minors to play in the Pacific Coast League; he finished with 3,216 hits over 21 total minor league seasons. He also managed the Salt Lake City Bees of the 1926 Utah–Idaho League. By January 1927, the press reported that Chadbourne was seeking an umpiring position. He was hired as a PCL umpire after the 1928 season.

Chadbourne was umpiring in the PCL in 1930 when he had a confrontation with star outfielder Buzz Arlett after a game and struck Arlett in the face with his umpire mask. Arlett required twelve stitches to his face and the injury may have cost him an opportunity to sign with the Brooklyn Dodgers. After Commissioner Kenesaw Mountain Landis investigated the incident, Chadbourne was fired.   

Chadbourne died in Los Angeles at age 58 by self-inflicted gunshot wound. He was survived by his wife, Gladys.

References

External links 

 Retrosheet
 

1884 births
1943 suicides
Baseball players from Maine
Major League Baseball outfielders
Boston Red Sox players
Boston Braves players
Minor league baseball managers
Suicides by firearm in California
People from Parkman, Maine
Worcester Busters players
Providence Grays (minor league) players
Indianapolis Indians players
Portland Beavers players
Kansas City Packers players
Memphis Chickasaws players
Oakland Oaks (baseball) players
Vernon Tigers players
Wichita Izzies players
Salt Lake City Bees players
Oklahoma City Indians players
Baseball coaches from Maine